The British Rail Class 197 is a class of diesel multiple unit passenger train built by CAF, based on its Civity platform. They are currently operated by Transport for Wales, split into 51 two-car units and 26 three-car units. The first train entered service in November 2022.

The new units will eventually replace  and  trains on various regional and regional express routes that form part of the Wales & Borders rail franchise, such as the Cambrian lines.

History
Operator KeolisAmey Wales took over the Wales & Borders franchise in October 2018. As part of their franchise award KeolisAmey were required to fully replace the various fleets of trains used to operate the franchise, several of which had originally been inherited from British Rail. Orders were placed with a number of manufacturers for new units, including one for 77 new Civity-family DMUs from Spanish firm Construcciones y Auxiliar de Ferrocarriles (CAF). These would be based on the  units CAF had started delivering to Arriva Rail North earlier in 2018, and would also be assembled at CAF's new factory in Newport. Entry into service was expected between 2021 and 2023. Unlike Class 195 units, however, the TfW-ordered DMUs have gangway connections at their ends allowing passengers and crew to move freely between coupled units.

Testing began soon thereafter.

Unit 197004 was the first to enter passenger service, doing so on 14 November 2022.

Specification concerns
In January 2020 WalesOnline reported, based on minutes from Transport for Wales board meetings, that TfW had "raised concerns" that the seats specified by KeolisAmey and CAF for the Class 197 order could be considered uncomfortable by passengers. The same model of seat is used on the  trains employed on Thameslink services in and around London, where some passengers—particularly those making longer journeys—have described them as being like "ironing boards". TfW argued that these would be "unsuitable for long distance journeys", which could last up to three hours on services operated by Class 197 trains, but noted that it did not have a "strong legal argument" to compel KeolisAmey and CAF to change the specification. TfW eventually paid an additional £1.9million to upgrade to higher-specification Fainsa Sophia seats, although these seats have themselves been the subject of some criticism from passengers of Great Western Railway trains to which they are also fitted.

Separately, a passenger advocacy group challenged the fact that TfW had specified only one toilet for each two-car Class 197 unit and two for each three-car unit; a reduction from the one-toilet-per-car configuration on TfW's existing long-distance Class  and  trains. The group also noted that the Rail Delivery Group's industry guideline for inter-urban trains throughout the UK states that there should be at least one toilet per 85 passengers, and a minimum of two toilets per train regardless of passenger capacity; but that two-car 197s would satisfy neither of these recommendations and that three-car 197s could exceed the 85-passengers-per-toilet ratio when near to fully loaded. TfW stated in response that many services would be operated by two-car Class 197s working as pairs, reducing the number of potential single-toilet services.

Fleet details

Variants
The order for the fleet is divided into four variants, as follows:
 30 units formed of two cars (-) with standard-class seating only, without ETCS;
 21 units formed of two cars (DMSL-DMS) with standard-class seating only, with ETCS;
 12 units formed of three cars (DMSL--DMS) with standard-class seating only, without ETCS;
 14 units formed of three cars (DMSL-MSL-) with a small section of first-class seating in the DMC car, without ETCS. These are primarily intended for use between Swansea and Manchester.

Two-car units will be able to run in multiple with up to three other two-car units, while three-car units will be able to run in multiple with up to two other three-car units.

Vehicle numbering
Individual vehicles are numbered as follows, with the last three digits of each vehicle number (represented in the table by 'nnn') matching those of the unit to which the vehicle belongs:

European Vehicle Numbers for the fleet are devised by prefixing the domestic vehicle number with type code 95, country code 70, and a leading zero; "95700...".

Named units
Unit 197007 is named Happy Valley.

See also

 British Rail Class 195 - A diesel multiple unit variant of the CAF Civity UK platform built for Northern.
 British Rail Class 196 - A diesel multiple unit variant of the CAF Civity UK platform built for West Midlands Trains.
 British Rail Class 331 - An electric multiple unit variant of the CAF Civity UK platform also built for Northern.
 British Rail Class 397 - An electric multiple unit variant of the CAF Civity UK platform built for TransPennine Express.

Notes

References

197
CAF multiple units
Train-related introductions in 2022